Güllaç (pronounced ) is a Turkish dessert made with milk, rose water, pomegranate and a special kind of pastry. It is consumed especially during Ramadan.

Güllaç is considered by some as being the origin of baklava. The similarities between the two desserts are many, such as the use of thin layers of dough and nuts in between. Güllaç dough is now prepared with corn starch and wheat flour, although originally it was made only with wheat starch. Güllaç contains walnuts between the layers that are put in milk.

Its first known mention is in a 14th-century book, Yinshan Zhenyao, a food and health manual written by Hu Sihui, a physician to the Mongol court of the Yuan dynasty. The book documents primarily Mongol and Turkic dishes that exhibit a limited amount of Chinese influence.

Güllaç was used for making Güllaç Lokması and Güllaç Baklavası, old Turkish desserts made during the Ottoman period in Turkey.

Etymology 
Turkish "güllaç" is thought to be loaned from the Persian word گلانج (gulanc). The earliest record of the word in a Turkic language dates back to 1477. It is first attested in the Persian-Turkish dictionary .

References

Turkish words and phrases
Turkish pastries
Fruit dishes